Beștepe is a commune in Tulcea County, Northern Dobruja, Romania. Its name comes from Turkish, meaning "five hills/peaks" (beş – five, tepe – hill/peak), due to a chain of hills which lie nearby.

In 2004, the commune was established via a local referendum by separation from the Mahmudia commune.

The Beștepe commune includes 3 villages:
 Beștepe
 Băltenii de Sus (Carasuhatu de Sus until 1964)
 Băltenii de Jos (Carasuhatu de Jos until 1964)

References

Communes in Tulcea County
Localities in Northern Dobruja
Place names of Turkish origin in Romania